Al Ga'da is a settlement in northern Western Sahara. It is within the Moroccan-controlled area of the territory, some 60 kilometres north of Smara and 40 kilometres south of As-Sakn.

Populated places in Western Sahara